Belmopan Blaze is a Belizean football team which competes in the Belize Premier Football League (BPFL) of the Football Federation of Belize. The Team is based in the nation's capital, Belmopan and their home stadiums are Isidoro Beaton Stadium, and FFB Field.

References 

Football clubs in Belize